Ōshio Station is the name of two train stations in Japan:

 Ōshio Station (Fukui) (王子保駅)
 Ōshio Station (Hyogo) (大塩駅)